Aivita Muze (born 18 January 2002) is a Latvian model.

While participating in a Latvian junior trivia show, Muze caught the attention of a model scout who approached her through social media.

She then signed with System Agency. At the age of sixteen, she debuted at Lanvin AW2018, which she opened.

Since then Muze has worked with a number of labels and designers, having been featured in campaigns for Louis Vuitton, Hugo Boss and Burberry. She has walked shows for Chanel, Fendi, Stella McCartney, and Burberry. Muze has also appeared on Vogue Poland, British Vogue for Nomad's Land in December 2021 as well as on L'Officiel in 2018 and has worked with beauty brands including Marc Jacobs (2019), Victoria Beckham (2021) as well as Hermes (2021).

She is currently signed with Viva Paris, London and Barcelona and is represented by D'Management in Milan.

References 

Latvian female models
2002 births
Living people
Place of birth missing (living people)